Longone Sabino is a  (municipality) in the Province of Rieti in the Italian region of Latium, located about  northeast of Rome and about  southeast of Rieti.

Geography
The municipality borders with Ascrea, Belmonte in Sabina, Cittaducale, Concerviano, Petrella Salto, Rieti and Rocca Sinibalda. The municipal territory counts a northern exclave in which are located its hamlets (frazioni): Fassinoro, Roccaranieri and San Silvestro.

References

External links

Page on www.sabina.it

Cities and towns in Lazio